Voice is CNBLUE's second Japanese mini-album. Voice is the only song which is not English. Y, Why was later released as a Korean song in their first Korean mini-album, Bluetory.
It is the first album to feature new bassist Lee Jung-shin

Track list
#1: Voice
#2: Wanna Be Like U
#3: Never Too Late
#4: Y, Why
#5: One of a Kind

Japanese-language EPs
2009 EPs
CNBLUE EPs